Gucheng District is a county-level district located in Lijiang City Prefecture, Yunnan, China.

Its county seat is the town of Dayan, otherwise known as the old town of Lijiang.

Administrative divisions
Gucheng District has 7 subdistricts, 2 towns, 1 township and 1 ethnic township. 
7 subdistricts

2 towns
 Jin'an
 Qihe
1 township
 Dadong
1 ethnic township
 Jinjiang Bai

References

External links
Gucheng District Official Website
Old Town of Lijiang

County-level divisions of Lijiang